Marcellous Lovelace (born October 26, 1975), better known by the stage name Infinito 2017, is an American hip hop musician and fine artist.  Alongside Thalone Davis and Cosmo Galactus, Infinito 2017 is a member of the Unorthodox Poets Society.

Early life 
Lovelace was born in Chicago, Illinois, to two parents employed by the United States military.  As such, he traveled regularly as a child.  He began creating music at age 13 with his cousin Dariel.  He moved to Kentucky with his mother in the early 1990s.  After Dariel died in 1994, Lovelace found comfort in hip hop music.  Shortly thereafter he moves to Tennessee and began recording.

Lovelace graduated from the University of Memphis in Memphis, receiving a bachelor's degree in Art and Communications, and later earned a Masters of Fine Arts.

Career 
While in college, Lovelace started performing on a regular basis at Fantasia hip-hop open mic nights. At this club he met Mr. Skurge, with whom he teamed up to form the Unorthodox Poets Society. Following Skruge's advice, Lovelace adopted Infinito as a stage name.  By 1998, he moved back to Chicago and joined up with crews the Molemen and the Nacrobats. In 2002, Infinito 2017 was involved with Music with Sound Right Reasoning, released on Birthwrite Records and produced by Memo of the Molemen. He went on to study at the Art Institute of Chicago.

Infinito 2017
In 2006, Infinito changed his name to Infinito 2017.  In 2011 he released his 60th album under the Infinito 2017 name titled Pause Record Not For Sensitive Ears.<ref>"Infinito 2017 Interview with Celebrityrewind.com". celebrityrewind.com</ref>  In 2011, Infinito 2017 toured internationally as an independent artist.

Discography

AlbumsMusic With Sound Right Reasoning (2002)Roddny Dangrr Fild (2005)The Soul of Benjamin Banneker In the Age of Aquarius (2006)Most High Definition (2008)It's No Such Thing As a Good Colonial Oppressor (2017)A Protagonist Life: Unscrambling Africa (2017)Indigenous Unification Inside the Endless Nothing (2017)Sample Uncleared On They Unintelligent Stolen Property (2017)Freedom Purpose Thought (2017)Mind of Advanced Resistance (2017)Decided Parts in A Movie of Subtitles (2017)Don't Have Time To Take To Much Time (2017)The Children Are Only An Expression of Their Development (2017)Praying With My Feet (2017)African Of Kenya Ether Part 18 (2017)

Singles and EPs
 Vintage Rhymes'' EP (1999)
 "Dance Little Dreamer" (2001)
 "Funky Nassau" (2001)

References

External links 
Official Website

Living people
American hip hop musicians
1975 births